The Cadogan–Sundberg indole synthesis, or simply Cadogan indole synthesis, is a name reaction in organic chemistry that allows for the generation of indoles from o-nitrostyrenes with the use of trialkyl phosphites, such as triethyl phosphite.

Mechanism
o-nitrostyrene first reacts with triethyl phosphite, and the nitro group is converted to a nitroso group. The nitroso group then reacts with the alkene, and N-hydroxylindole is formed, which reacts again with triethyl phosphite to form the indole.

Application
The Cadogan–Sundberg indole synthesis has been used as an intermediate step in the total synthesis of Tjipanazole E, transforming 2-[trans-2-[5-Chloro-2-nitrophenyl)vinyl]-5-chloro-1H-indole to 5,5’-Dichloro-2,2’-biindole.

References

Indole forming reactions
Carbon-heteroatom bond forming reactions
Name reactions